William Scott Ashmore (29 October 1929 – 23 August 1992) was an English first-class cricketer. Ashmore was a left-handed batsman who bowled left-arm medium-fast. He was born at St John's Wood, London.

Ashmore made two first-class appearances for Middlesex, both against Cambridge University in 1946 and 1947. He batted in three innings' for Middlesex scoring a total of 18 runs, ending each innings not out. With the ball, he took 3 wickets at an average of 38.33, with best figures of 2/37. In 1948, he made a single first-class appearance for a Combined Services team against Hampshire.

He was married to Favol May Speed, the first female scorer at Lord's. He died at Crawley, Sussex on 23 August 1992.

References

External links
William Ashmore at Cricinfo
William Ashmore at CricketArchive

1929 births
1992 deaths
People from St John's Wood
English cricketers
Middlesex cricketers
Combined Services cricketers